Tamás is a Hungarian, masculine given name.  It is a Hungarian equivalent of the name Thomas.

The given name may refer to:

 Tamás Bognár (born 1978), Hungarian footballer
 Tamás Gábor (1932–2007), Hungarian Olympic champion épée fencer
 Tamás Mendelényi (1936–1999), Hungarian fencer
 Tamás Varga (rower) (born 1978), Hungarian rower
 Tamás Varga (water polo) (born 1975), Hungarian water polo player
 Tamás Wichmann (1948–2020), Hungarian canoer

Tamás is also used as a surname. Notable holders of the surname include:

 G.M. Tamás (born 1948), Hungarian philosopher, critic, and former politician

See also

 All Wikipedia pages beginning with Tamás

Hungarian masculine given names